Likhu  is a village development committee in Dolpa District in the Karnali Zone of north-western Nepal. At the time of the 1991 Nepal census it had a population of 1465 persons living in 262 individual households.

References

External links
UN map of the municipalities of Dolpa District

Populated places in Dolpa District